Events in the year 1358 in Norway.

Incumbents
Monarch: Haakon VI Magnusson

Events

Arts and literature

Births

Deaths
Isabel Bruce, Queen consort (born c. 1272 in Scotland).

References

Norway